Thanjavur Quartet  were four brothers, Chinnayya, Ponnayya, Sivanandam and Vadivelu, who lived during the early 19th century and contributed to the development of  Bharatanatyam and Carnatic music. They excelled in the art of Bharatanatyam.The brothers  were employed in the courts of the Maratha King Serfoji II at Thanjavur initially, and then moved to Travancore to the Court of Swati Tirunal. They lived in the courts of Tulajaji and Sarabhoji kings. The Tanjore brothers gave the actual form of the recent day repertoire of Bharatanatyam - The Margam.

Musical training
At the encouragement of the King they learnt the nuances of Carnatic music from a number of exponents of their time including Muthuswami Dikshitar. Dikshitar appreciated Vadivelu Pillai as an ekasandhagrahi, one who had the ability to repeat a song heard only once. The quartet wrote a set of nine songs called navaratna mela in tribute of their teacher.

After a stint at the courts of Serfoji, the brothers moved to Travancore and were patronised by Swati Tirunal.  The king appointed Vadivelu Pillai as the court musician.  Vadivelu Pillai also learnt to play the violin gained expertise and demonstrated that not only Kalpita sangeetam but Manodharma sangeetam could also be easily and deftly played on the instrument.  Vadivelu was the first to introduce Violin instrument to Carnatic music.

Compositions 
The four brothers composed numerous varnams and kritis.  Some of these are Amba Souramba and Amba Neelamba, Ambaneelambari (Neelambari), Satileni (Poorvikalyani), apart from the navaratna mala.These brothers composed number of Varnas and Kritis.They were the first to formalise the performance pattern of bharatanatyam, and codify lessons called adavus (basic steps and the different categories of rhythm patterns) required for the same. They were the ones to plan and set the order of the different items of the repertoire in performance. The order they set was as follows. Melaprapti, Alarippu, Jatiswaram, Sabdam, swarajati, Chauka Varnam, Ragamalika, Padam, Javali, and Tillana. They also composed several pieces for each category set to different ragas and talas (rhythm structure). The compositions were in Telugu, their mother tongue, and they addressed their family deities, Sri Brihadisvara and Brihannayaki, as well as the kings and ministers who patronised them and also the different deities whom they worshipped during their travels.

See also 
 List of Carnatic composers

References 

 Carnatica.net
 Arul Francis: Tanjore Quartet
 Tanjore Quartet Compositions
 Brihadisha - Tanjore Quartet
 The Musical Genius of Tanjavur Quartet
 Heritage Town

Carnatic composers
Thanjavur
People from Thanjavur district